Punishment is the authoritative imposition of something negative or unpleasant on a person or animal in response to behavior deemed wrong by an individual or group.

Punishment or The Punishment may also refer to:

Common uses
 Punishment (psychology)
 Capital punishment
 School discipline, punishment at school

Arts, entertainment, and media
 Punishment (album), an album by American hardcore band Endwell
 "Punishment" (poem), a poem by the Irish poet Seamus Heaney
 Punishment (TV series), an Australian soap opera
 Boot Camp (film), a 2008 film also known as Punishment
 The Punishment (1912 film), a 1912 silent film
 The Punishment (1976 film), a 1976 Romanian film
 "Punishment", a 1992 song by Biohazard from Urban Discipline
 "Punishment", a 2011 song by Man Overboard from their self-titled album
 "The Punishment", a song by Tarot

See also
 Team Punishment,  a mixed martial arts training camp